Richard Smith may refer to:

Arts and entertainment
 Richard Penn Smith (1799–1854), American playwright
 Richard Smith (silent film director) (1886–1937), American silent film director
 Richard Smith (screenwriter), Scottish screenwriter, film director, BAFTA-winning writer of Trauma
 Richard Smith (artist) (1931–2016), English painter
 Richard Bernhard Smith (1901–1935), American composer who wrote the lyrics to "Winter Wonderland"
 Richard Smith (American guitarist), jazz guitarist in California
 Richard Smith (English guitarist) (born 1971), English-born fingerstyle guitarist in Nashville, Tennessee
 Richard John Smith (1786-1855), British actor 
 Richard Langham Smith (born 1947), British academic, head of music at the Open University
 Richard Curson Smith, British television director and producer
 Richard H.E. Smith II, American software engineer, computer consultant and science fiction fanzine publisher
 Richard Zane Smith, Wyandot sculptor 
 Rickey Smith (singer), contestant on American Idol
 Richard O'Brien (Richard Timothy Smith, born 1942), TV presenter
 Ricky Smith (Doctor Who), fictional character in British TV series Doctor Who, played by Noel Clarke
 Rick Smith (musician) (born 1959), member of English dance duo Underworld

Journalism
 Richard Mills Smith (born 1946), American editor and journalist, Chairman of Newsweek magazine
 Richard Smith (editor), British medical doctor, former editor of the British Medical Journal
 Richard Allen  Smith, front page writer at VetVoice, the blog of VoteVets.org

Military
 Richard Smith (soldier) ( - 1819), Canadian soldier and magistrate
 Richard Baird Smith (1818–1861), British engineer officer
 Richard Abel Smith (1933–2004), British Army officer
 Richard Smith (East India Company officer) (1734–1803), Commander-in-Chief, India

Politics
 Richard Smith (MP for Arundel), Member of Parliament (MP) for Arundel in 1416 and 1417
 Richard Smith (MP for Devizes), MP for Devizes, 1402
 Richard Smith (died 1516), MP for Reading
 Richard Smith (died 1581), MP for Newcastle-under-Lyme
 Richard Smith (fl. 1584), MP for Cricklade
 Richard Smith (Canadian politician) (1931–1978), former Liberal MPP for Nipissing, Ontario
 Richard Smith (Continental Congress) (1735–1803), lawyer and New Jersey delegate to the Continental Congress
 Richard B. Smith (New York politician) (1878–1937), New York politician
 Richard M. Smith (1828–1888), legislator from Mineral Point, Wisconsin
 Richard Smith (diplomat) (1934–2015), Australian diplomat, Australian High Commissioner to the United Kingdom
 Richard Joseph Smith (1819–1883), member of both the New South Wales Legislative Council and the Queensland Legislative Council
 Richard A. Smith (Connecticut politician), American politician in the Connecticut House of Representatives
 Ric Smith (Richard C. Smith, born 1944), Australian public servant
 Richard H. Smith (born 1945), member of the Georgia House of Representatives

Science
 Richard Smith (mining engineer) (1783–1868), English-born mining engineer and politician in Nova Scotia
 Richard Smith (historical geographer) (born 1946), British academic, historical geographer and demographer
 Richard A. Smith (physician) (1932–2017), African-American physician
 Richard Bowyer Smith (1837–1919), Australian inventor
 Richard D. Smith (born 1949), American chemist, Director of Pan-omics and Proteomics Research at Pacific Northwest National Laboratory
 Richard G. Smith (engineer) (born 1929), director of NASA's John F. Kennedy Space Center
 Richard G. Smith (geographer), British geographer
 Richard Harbert Smith (1894–1957), professor and researcher of aeronautical engineering
 Richard J. Smith (born 1948), American dentist, anthropologist, head of graduate studies at Washington University in St. Louis
 R. N. Smith (Richard Norman Smith), president of the British Veterinary Association

Sports
 Richard Smith (rugby union, born 1973), former Wales international rugby union player
 Richard Smith (rugby league) (born 1973), rugby league player
 Richard Smith (footballer, born 1967), English footballer for Mansfield Town and Wolverhampton Wanderers
 Richard Smith (footballer, born 1970), English footballer for Leicester City, Cambridge United and Grimsby Town
 Richard Smith (wide receiver) (born 1980), American football player
 Richard Smith (American football coach) (born 1955), former defensive coordinator for the NFL's Houston Texans
 Richard Shore Smith (1877–1953), American football player and coach
 Ricky Smith (American football) (born 1960), former American football cornerback
 Rick Smith (American football executive), general manager of the Houston Texans
 Rick Smith (ice hockey) (born 1948), professional hockey player
 Richard Smith (field hockey) (born 1987), British field hockey player
 Richard Smith (rugby union, born 1987), Cardiff Blues centre
 Richard Smith (umpire) (born 1972), Irish cricket umpire
 Richard Smith (Costa Rican footballer) (born 1967), former footballer with Alajuelense, Antigua and Carmelita
 Richard Smith (sport shooter) (born 1950), American sports shooter
 Richard Smith (Barbadian cricketer) (1873-1954), Barbadian cricketer
 Richard Smith (Trinidadian cricketer) (born 1971), Trinidadian cricketer
 Richard Smith (South African cricketer) (born 1972), South African cricketer

Other
 Richard A. Smith (businessman) (1925–2020), American business executive
 Richard Smith (businessman) (1836–1919) managing director of Australian company Harris Scarfe
 Richard Gordon Smith (1858–1918), British traveller, sportsman and naturalist
 Dick Smith (entrepreneur) (Richard Harold Smith), Australian businessman
 Richard Norton Smith (born 1953), U.S. Presidential historian
 Richard Sharp Smith (1852–1924), English then American architect
 Richard Smith (merchant) (1707–1776), English merchant in the West Indies trade
 Richard Smith (settler) (1596–1666), one of earliest settlers of Rhode Island
 Richard Smith (bishop) (1568–1655), English Catholic Bishop, titular of Chalcedon in Asia Minor
 Richard William Smith (born 1959), Canadian prelate of the Roman Catholic Church
 Richard F. Smith (born c. 1961), American business executive
 Richard Tilden Smith (1865–1929), British businessman
 Richard Patrick Smith, Archbishop of Port of Spain, Trinidad

See also
 Dick Smith (disambiguation)
 Richard Smyth (disambiguation)
 Rick Smith (disambiguation)